State Route 124 (SR 124) is an east–west state highway in the southern portion of the U.S. state of Ohio. The road passes through numerous villages along its route, many of them economically depressed. State Route 124 has the longest concurrency of state routes in Ohio, running concurrent with State Route 32 for 35½ miles. The road was recently rerouted in 2003 following the extension of U.S. Route 33 to the Ravenswood Bridge.

History

1934 – Extended to Portland.
1934 – Extended to Portland.
1969 – Joined with State Route 7 along Pomeroy bypass.
unknown – Givens to Roads upgraded to divided highway.
1997 – Jasper to Givens upgraded to divided highway.
2009 - Routed along Athens County Road 62 (Youba Ridge Rd.) from Hockingport to a new eastern terminus near Torch. The former section from Hockingport to Little Hocking had been permanently closed in 2005 due to a landslide.

Before 1926
1924 – Original route established; originally routed from Sharonville to Franklin.
1926 – Entire route became a portion of the former U.S. Route 25.

Major junctions

References

124
Transportation in Clinton County, Ohio
Transportation in Highland County, Ohio
Transportation in Pike County, Ohio
Transportation in Jackson County, Ohio
Transportation in Vinton County, Ohio
Transportation in Meigs County, Ohio
Transportation in Athens County, Ohio
U.S. Route 33
U.S. Route 25